The 2022 League of Ireland Premier Division, known as the SSE Airtricity League Premier Division for sponsorship reasons, is the 38th season of the League of Ireland Premier Division, the top Irish league for association football clubs since its establishment in 1985. Shamrock Rovers were the defending champions, having won their nineteenth Premier Division title the previous season. They retained the title on 24 October as a result of Derry City drawing 0-0 away to Sligo Rovers.

Teams 
Ten teams compete in the league – the top eight teams from the previous season and the two teams promoted from the First Division. The promoted teams were Shelbourne and UCD, after respective top flight absences of one and three years.
They replaced Longford Town (relegated after just one year back in the top flight), and Waterford (relegated via play-off after four years back in the top flight).

Stadiums and locations

Personnel and kits 

Note: Flags indicate national team as has been defined under FIFA eligibility rules. Players may hold more than one non-FIFA nationality.

Managerial changes

League table

Standings

Positions by round

The table lists the positions of teams after each week of matches. In order to preserve chronological evolvements, any postponed matches are not included in the round at which they were originally scheduled but added to the full round they were played immediately afterward.

Results
Teams will play each other four times (twice at home, twice away).

Matches 1–18

Matches 19–36

*Note Sligo Rovers defeated Dundalk 2–0 but the result was overturned by the Football Association of Ireland to a 3–0 win for Dundalk after it was ruled that Sligo had fielded a suspended player.

Season statistics

Top scorers

Clean sheets

Play-offs

Bracket

First Division play-off Semi-finals

First leg

Second leg

First Division play-off Final

Promotion/relegation play-off

Awards

Monthly awards

Annual awards

See also 

 2022 President of Ireland's Cup
 2022 FAI Cup
 2022 League of Ireland First Division
 2022 St Patrick's Athletic F.C. season
 2022 Bohemian F.C. season
 2022 Shelbourne F.C. season
 2022 Dundalk F.C. season

References

External links 
 Soccerway
 UEFA

 
1
League of Ireland Premier Division seasons
1
Ireland
Ireland